Angraecum eburneum is a species of orchid. Their common name the "comet orchid". They are native to Madagascar, Comoros, Seychelles, Réunion, Mauritius, Kenya, and Tanzania.

Description
Flowering begins in early winter and takes several months.

Symbolism
Claire Waight Keller included the plant to represent Seychelles in Meghan Markle's wedding veil, which included the distinctive flora of each Commonwealth country.

Gallery

References

eburneum
Flora of East Tropical Africa
Flora of the Western Indian Ocean